Ardler railway station served the village of Ardler in the Scottish county of Perth and Kinross. Its proximity to Alyth Junction made it part of the divergence of the Dundee and Newtyle Railway from the Scottish Midland Junction Railway running between Perth and Arbroath.

History
Opened by the Scottish Midland Junction Railway, and absorbed into the Caledonian Railway, it became part of the London, Midland and Scottish Railway during the Grouping of 1923. Passing on to the Scottish Region of British Railways on nationalisation in 1948, it was then closed by the British Transport Commission.

References

Notes

Sources

External links
 RAILSCOT on Scottish Midland Junction Railway
 RAILSCOT on Dundee and Newtyle Railway

Disused railway stations in Perth and Kinross
Railway stations in Great Britain opened in 1837
Railway stations in Great Britain closed in 1956
Former Caledonian Railway stations